"Love This Town" is a song by Dizzee Rascal, featuring vocals from Teddy Sky. The song was written by Dylan Mills, Teddy Sky, RedOne, Jimmy Joker and Eric Sanicola. The song was released on 29 November 2013 as a digital download in the United Kingdom as the third single from his fifth studio album, The Fifth (2013). The song has peaked at number 35 on the UK Singles Chart and number 34 on the Scottish Singles Chart.

Track listings

Credits and personnel
 Vocals – Dizzee Rascal, Teddy Sky
 Lyrics – Dylan Mills, Teddy Sky, RedOne, Jimmy Joker, Eric Sanicola
 Producer – RedOne, Teddy Sky, Eric Sanicola, Jimmy Joker
 Label: Dirtee Stank, Island Records

Chart performance

Weekly charts

Release history

References

2013 singles
Dizzee Rascal songs
2013 songs
Eurodance songs
Songs written by RedOne
Songs written by Eric Sanicola
Songs written by Dizzee Rascal
Island Records singles